Varanasi Vishnu Namboothiri is a Maddalam exponent from Kerala, India, best known for playing Maddalam for Kathakali performances. He received several noted awards including Sangeet Natak Akademi Award,  Kerala Sangeetha Nataka Akademi Gurupooja Award and Kerala Kalamandalam Award.

Biography
Vishnu Namboothiri was born on January 20, 1937, in Mavelikkara in present-day Alappuzha district to Varanasi Illam Narayanan Namboothiri and Draupadi Antarjan. He is the brother of famous Kathakali chenda artist Varanasi Madhavan Namboothiri. They were known as the Varanasi Brothers.

He started practicing Maddalam during his high school years. Karuvatta Kumarapanikkar and Vennimala Ramavaryar introduced Vishnu Namboothiri to play Maddalam. He received his expert Maddalam training from Kerala Kalamandalam under Kalamandalam Appukutty Pothuval and Kalamandalam Nambisankutty and from Unnai Warrier Memorial Kalanilayam under Chalakudy Narayanan Nambisan.

Vishnu Namboothiri is well known for playing Maddalam for Kathakali and has performed with renowned Kathakali artists such as Kalamandalam Krishnan Nair, Chengannur Raman Pillai, Mankulam Vishnu Namboothiri, Kudamalur Karunakaran Nair, Guru Gopinath, Champakulam Pachu Pillai and Kurichi Kunjan Panicker. He made his debut in 1952 at the Mavelikkara Mannur Math Palace Shiva Temple. He stopped his performances in 2002 with the death of his brother. But later, in 2012, at  the time of Lavanasura Vadham Kathakali in Mavelikkara Kandiyoor temple, he again played Maddalam at the insistence of the audience.

He is a former board member of Kerala Kalamandalam and Kerala Sangeetha Nataka Akademi. He was Mel Santhi (head priest) of Mavelikkara Mannur Math Palace Lord Shiva temple.

Personal life and death
He and his wife Payyannur Koroth Velliyott Illam Saraswati Antharjanam have two children. He died at a private hospital in Thiruvalla on 2020 January 28. The funeral was held in the courtyard of his house with official honors from Kerala government.

Awards and honors
Sangeet Natak Akademi Award (2015)
Kerala Sangeetha Nataka Akademi Gurupooja Award (2007)
Kerala Kalamandalam Vadya Award (2009)
Kalamandalam Hyderali Memorial Award
Travancore Devaswom Board's Kalaratnam
Kanchi Kamakoti Peetham has been awarded him the title Asthana Vidwan (Head Scholar)
Chennithala Chellappan Pillai Memorial Award
Kalamandalam Padmashree Krishnan Nair Memorial Award
Kalamandalam Appukutty Pothuval Memorial Award
Kalamandalam Krishnankutty Pothuval Memorial Kalasagar Award
Kannur Neelakanthar Memorial Kathakali Award

References 

1937 births
2020 deaths
Kathakali exponents
Carnatic instrumentalists
Recipients of the Sangeet Natak Akademi Award
Malayali people
People from Alappuzha district